Bucklands Beach AFC is a semi-professional football club based in Bucklands Beach, New Zealand. It currently competes in the NRFL Northern Conference.

Having won promotion to the NRFL Division 2 for the first time in the 2016 season, Bucklands Beach immediately won promotion to NRFL Division 1 in 2017.

The club has also completed in the Chatham Cup a number of times including every year since 2013. Their best run was in 2018 when it made it to the third round before losing 0–5 to East Coast Bays.

References

External links
Club website
Club profile on The Ultimate New Zealand Soccer Website

Association football clubs in Auckland
1976 establishments in New Zealand